Bryn Hafod is an area in the  community of Llannerch-y-medd, Ynys Môn, Wales, which is 137.8 miles (221.8 km) from Cardiff and 219 miles (352.4 km) from London. Bryn Hafod is represented in the Senedd by Rhun ap Iorwerth (Plaid Cymru) and is part of the Ynys Môn constituency in the House of Commons.

The renowned artist Keith Andrew has an art gallery at the village.

References

See also
List of localities in Wales by population

Villages in Anglesey